Aeson is a figure in Greek mythology.

Aeson or Aison (ancient Greek: Αἰσών or Αἴσων) may also refer to:
Aeson (Thessaly), a town in ancient Thessaly
Aeson (Thrace), a town in ancient Thrace
Aesion, an Athenian orator 
Aison (vase painter), the red-figure painter